Ölöng-Bulak is a village in Jalal-Abad Region of Kyrgyzstan. It is part of the Aksy District. The village was established 
in the area of Kashka-Suu rural settlement (ayyl ökmötü) and was officially assigned to ayyl (village) category in July 2019. Its population was 1,241 in 2021.

References
 

Populated places in Jalal-Abad Region